Hertog is a Dutch ice cream brand, owned by the Anglo-Dutch Unilever conglomerate. It was first introduced by Willem den Hertog in the summer of 1976 in the Netherlands. In 1996, Unilever bought the brand, and continued selling it.

References

External links
 Official website 

Ice cream brands
Unilever brands
Dutch brands
Products introduced in 1976